The Vagabond Motel is a historic motel located at 7301 Biscayne Boulevard in Miami, Florida that exhibits Miami Modern architecture. The building was listed on the National Register of Historic Places in late 2014 after being nominated by the state. The building was constructed in 1953 and was designed by Robert Swartburg. After sitting vacant for years, the building was reopened in 2014 as a restaurant and hotel.

Claims that the Vagabond Motel was once a hangout for Frank Sinatra and the Rat Pack are false. The Biscayne Times debunked those rumors in 2012. In the 1950s and 1960s, celebrities frequented the long-gone Vagabonds' Club in downtown Miami, not the middle-class family motel on the Upper East Side.

References

Hotels in Miami
Hotels established in 1953
Hotel buildings completed in 1953
1953 establishments in Florida